A106 may refer to:

Agusta A.106, a helicopter
Alpine A106, a car
A106 road
A106 autoroute
A106 (Atom: The Beginning), a character in the manga series Atom: The Beginning